Abou Karamba Kassamba (died 2001) was a politician in The Gambia.

Kassamba was elected as a member of the National Assembly of the Gambia in 1997 in the United Democratic Party. Kassamba received about 58.14% of the vote.

Kassamba died in a car accident along with the politician Kunda Kamara, the politician Buba Samura, and two others.

References

Members of the National Assembly of the Gambia
Gambian politicians
2001 deaths
Date of birth unknown